The House of Giray, also Girays, were the Genghisid/Turkic dynasty that reigned in the Khanate of Crimea from its formation in 1431 until its downfall in 1783. The dynasty also supplied several khans of Kazan and Astrakhan between 1521 and 1550. Apart from the royal Girays, there was also a lateral branch, the Choban Girays (Çoban Geraylar).

Before reaching the age of majority, young Girays were brought up in one of the Circassian tribes, where they were instructed in the arts of war. The Giray Khans were elected by other Crimean Tatar dynasts, called myrzas (mırzalar). They also elected an heir apparent, called the qalgha sultan (qalğa sultan). In later centuries, the Ottoman Sultan obtained the right of installing and deposing the khans at his will.

Their early ancestor was Togay Timur (Tuqa Timur), a younger son of Jochi. The story of the Girays begin with Öreng Timur, son of Togay Timur, receiving Crimea from Mengu-Timur.

During Ottoman suzerainty

According to some scholars, the Girays were regarded as the second family of the Ottoman Empire after the House of Ottoman: "If Rome and Byzantium represented two of the three international traditions of imperial legitimacy, the blood of Genghis Khan was the third... If ever the Ottomans became extinct, it was understood that the Genghisid Girays would succeed them" 

During the 15th and early 16th centuries, the Giray Khan was second to the Ottoman Emperor - and thus superior to the Grand Vizier - in the Ottoman protocol. After the disobedience and 1584 removal of Mehmed II Giray, the Sultan demoted the Crimean Khan to the level of Grand Vizier. The Giray Khans were also sovereigns of their own realm. They could mint coins, make law by decree, and had their own tughras.

Alliances

The Crimean Khanate made alliances with the Polish–Lithuanian Commonwealth and with the Zaporizhian Sich. The assistance of İslâm III Giray during the Khmelnytsky Uprising in 1648 contributed greatly to the initial momentum of military successes for the Cossacks. The relationship with the Polish–Lithuanian Commonwealth was also strong - the dynasty of Girays would seek sanctuary in Lithuania in the 15th century before establishing themselves on the Crimean peninsula.

Downfall

After the khanate's annexation by Imperial Russia in 1783, the last khan Şahin Giray remained nominally in power until 1787, when he took refuge in the Ottoman Empire, and was executed in Rhodes.

Other dynasts were permitted by the Russian authorities to reside in their Bakhchisaray palace. Selim III's young son, Qattı Giray, was converted by missionaries to Protestantism and married a Scottish heiress, Anne Neilson.

After downfall

After the execution of Şahin Giray by Abdul Hamid I, his family lived in Burgazada, Istanbul.

The today's head of the House of Girays is Prince Dzhezzar Pamir Giray, who is now living in London.

See also

History of the Turks
List of Turkic dynasties and countries
List of Crimean khans
List of Kazan khans

Notes

Crimean Khanate
Crimean Khans
European royal families
Islam in Ukraine
Turkic dynasties
Ukrainian monarchy